Requesens is a Catalan surname. It may refer to:

People
Galceran de Requesens y Santa Coloma, Catalan nobleman
Several people with the name Lluís de Requesens
Luis de Zúñiga y Requesens (1528—1576), Spanish politician and diplomat
Juan de Zúñiga y Requesens (d.1586), Spanish diplomat, viceroy of Naples
Juan Requesens (b.1989), Venezuelan politician
Pedro III Fajardo de Zúñiga y Requesens (1602–1647), Spanish soldier and aristocrat
Rafaela Requesens (b.1992), Venezuelan activist

Places
Requesens Castle, Alt Empordà, Catalonia

See also
Recasens